Mastigoteuthis flammea (flaming whiplash squid) is a species of whip-lash squid.

References

 Chun, C. 1910. Die Cephalopoden. Oegopsida. Wissenschaftliche Ergebnisse der Deutschen Tiefsee Expedition auf dem Dampfer "Valdivia" 1898-1899 18(1): 1-401.

External links

 Tree of Life web project: Mastigoteuthis flammea

Mastigoteuthis
Molluscs described in 1908
Taxa named by Carl Chun